Chattahoochee County, also known as Cusseta-Chattahoochee County, is a county located on the western border in central Georgia. As of the 2020 census, the population was 9,565. The county seat is Cusseta, with which the county shares a consolidated city-county government. The city of Cusseta remains a geographically distinct municipality within Chattahoochee County. The county was created on February 13, 1854.

Chattahoochee County is included in the Columbus, GA-AL Metropolitan Statistical Area.

History
This area was occupied by the historic Muscogee people (also known as the Creek) at the time of European encounter. They had a large confederacy in the Southeast. They were among the Five Civilized Tribes who were forcibly removed to Indian Territory in the 1830s during the administration of President Andrew Jackson. European Americans moved into their former areas, in some cases acquiring land through lotteries run by the state.

The Georgia General Assembly created Chattahoochee County on February 13, 1854, from portions of Muscogee and Marion counties. It is named for the Chattahoochee River that forms its western boundary. The county seat was named Cusseta to commemorate the historic Creek Indian town of that name that long existed nearby. In 2004–2005, the U.S. Census Bureau reported a 6.2% population decline, making this county at the top of those nationally with shrinking populations.

The original courthouse, built in 1854 by enslaved African Americans, is preserved at the tourist attraction of Westville in Columbus, Georgia.

Since 1918, most of the land in Chattahoochee County has been part of the Fort Benning military reservation.

Geography

The vast majority of Chattahoochee County is located in the Middle Chattahoochee River-Walter F. George Lake subbasin of the ACF River Basin (Apalachicola-Chattahoochee-Flint River Basin). The very small southeastern corner of the county is located in the Kinchafoonee-Muckalee subbasin of the same larger ACF Basin.

Major highways
  U.S. Route 27
  U.S. Route 280
  State Route 1
  State Route 26
  State Route 355
  State Route 520

Adjacent counties
 Muscogee County (north)
 Talbot County (northeast)
 Marion County (east)
 Stewart County (south)
 Russell County, Alabama (which is west of the border of Central Standard Time border except for Phenix City, Alabama, a part of the Columbus Metropolitan Area)

Demographics
The county population has declined by more than half since its peak in 1970. People have left for job opportunities elsewhere.

2020 census

As of the 2020 United States Census, there were 9,565 people, 2,570 households, and 1,886 families residing in the county.

2010 census
As of the 2010 United States Census, there were 11,267 people, 2,686 households, and 2,067 families residing in the county. The racial makeup of the county was 68.8% white, 18.8% black or African American, 2.2% Asian, 0.7% American Indian, 0.6% Pacific islander, 4.4% from other races, and 4.4% from two or more races. Those of Hispanic or Latino origin made up 12.4% of the population. In terms of ancestry, 17.5% were German, 14.9% were Irish, 10.1% were English, 6.8% were Italian, and 3.1% were American.

Of the 2,686 households, 53.7% had children under the age of 18 living with them, 57.0% were married couples living together, 16.2% had a female householder with no husband present, 23.0% were non-families, and 19.1% of all households were made up of individuals. The average household size was 2.98 and the average family size was 3.45. The median age was 24.0 years.  Although its population has declined, the county was notable in 2016 for having the highest proportion of millennials (persons 15–34 years old) of any county within the United States: 59.7%.

The median income for a household in the county was $51,089 and the median income for a family was $55,745. Males had a median income of $41,117 versus $31,422 for females. The per capita income for the county was $22,202. About 14.7% of families and 15.9% of the population were below the poverty line, including 18.4% of those under age 18 and 30.7% of those age 65 or over.

Education
The Chattahoochee County School District holds pre-school to grade twelve, and consists of one elementary school, a middle school, and a high school. The district has 85 full-time teachers and over 1000 students.
Chattahoochee County Education Center
Chattahoochee County Middle School
Chattahoochee County High School

All parts of the county except Fort Benning are zoned to county schools for all grades. Fort Benning children are zoned to Department of Defense Education Activity (DoDEA) schools for grades K-8. However Fort Benning high school students attend the public high schools in the respective counties they are located in.

Politics

Communities

Cities
 Cusseta

Former census-designated places
 Fort Benning South (now part of Cusseta)

Unincorporated communities
 Ida Vesper

See also

 National Register of Historic Places listings in Chattahoochee County, Georgia
List of counties in Georgia

References

External links
 Columbus Enquirer archive at Digital Library of Georgia
 Chattahoochee County historical marker

 
1854 establishments in Georgia (U.S. state)
Georgia (U.S. state) counties
Georgia placenames of Native American origin
Columbus metropolitan area, Georgia
Populated places established in 1854